Anne Germond (born 1960) is a South African-born Anglican bishop in Canada. Since 10 October 2018, she has served as Metropolitan of the Ecclesiastical Province of Ontario, as well as Archbishop of Algoma and Archbishop of Moosonee, in the Anglican Church of Canada. She had served as Bishop of Algoma from February 2017 until becoming its archbishop upon election as 19th Metropolitan of Ontario.

Early life and education
Germond was born in South Africa, and was educated at St. Theresa's School, Johannesburg, a convent Catholic school. She converted from Roman Catholicism to Anglicanism during high school. She and her husband, Colin Germond, migrated to Canada in 1986. Germond is a graduate of Thorneloe University's School of Theology. She was ordained as a deacon in 2001 and as a priest in 2002.

Ordained ministry
Germond was the rector of the Anglican Church of the Ascension in Sudbury, Ontario, until 2016. She also held the position of archdeacon within the Deanery of Sudbury-Manitoulin. She has been the chancellor of Thorneloe University, an affiliated college of Laurentian University in Sudbury, since 2015.

She was elected as the 11th Bishop of Algoma on 14 October 2016, and consecrated and installed on 11 February 2017. Germond is the first woman to serve as the Bishop of Algoma Diocese.

On 10 October 2018, she was elected as the next metropolitan of the Province of Ontario. As metropolitan, she was also promoted to archbishop of the dioceses of Algoma and Moosonee (the metropolitan is ex officio diocesan bishop of Moosonee).

Germond is the third woman to hold the position of archbishop in the Anglican Communion and the first woman to hold the role of metropolitan of Ontario. As metropolitan, Germond oversees the Ecclesiastical Province of Ontario's synod and house of bishops.

References

1960 births
Living people
South African Anglicans
Anglican bishops of Algoma
Anglican bishops of Moosonee
Converts to Anglicanism from Roman Catholicism
21st-century Anglican Church of Canada bishops
Women Anglican bishops
People from Johannesburg
Metropolitans of Ontario